Ivan Bartoš (born 20 March 1980) is a Czech civil rights activist and a Czech Pirate Party politician, serving as the Minister of Regional Development and Deputy Prime Minister for Digitalization in the governing Cabinet of Petr Fiala since December 2021. He has been a member of the Chamber of Deputies of the Czech Republic since October 2017, and the chairman of the party since 2016, as well as previously between 2009 and 2014.

Early life 
Ivan Bartoš was born on 20 March 1980 in Jablonec nad Nisou, an industrial town in northern Bohemia. He studied information studies and librarianship at the Faculty of Arts, Charles University in Prague and participated in a student exchange program at the University of New Orleans. Subsequently, Bartoš worked in the IT industry and was elected chairman of the Pirate Party in October 2009.

Political career

Leader of the Pirate Party 
Bartoš led the party into its first national elections in 2010, with the Pirates receiving 0.8% of the vote and therefore no representation in the Chamber of Deputies.

Bartoš was the party's leading candidate again in legislative elections in 2013. The party won 2.66% of the vote, not reaching the 5% electoral threshold. Bartoš was the Pirates' leading candidate for the 2014 European Parliament election, but the party narrowly missed the 5% electoral threshold, receiving 4.78% of the vote. In June 2014, Bartoš resigned as party leader.

In parliament 
Bartoš was elected party chairman again in 2016 and led the Pirates into the 2017 legislative elections, taking 10.8% of the national vote to become the third largest party in the Chamber of Deputies, with 22 out of 200 seats. He served as the chairman of the Committee on Public Administration and Regional Development from November 2017 until November 2021.

Bartoš was re-elected as party leader in 2018 and led the party's campaign for the 2018 local elections, where the leading Pirate candidate in Prague, Zdeněk Hřib, was elected Mayor of Prague. In 2019, Bartoš campaigned for the European Parliament election in support of the Pirate Party list and lead candidate Marcel Kolaja. The party gained 13.95% of the vote and entered the European Parliament with three MEPs.

In government 
In January 2020, Bartoš was re-elected as party leader. In December 2020, he became the lead candidate of the electoral coalition of the Pirate Party and Mayors and Independents (STAN) for the 2021 Czech legislative election and was re-elected. Subsequently, Bartoš was nominated to serve as the Minister of Regional Development and Deputy Prime Minister for Digitalization in the governing Cabinet of Petr Fiala.

Personal life and views 
He is a member of the Czechoslovak Hussite Church, and has been married since 2015. He has supported anti-fascist events and is a pacifist. Bartoš participates in "do it yourself" culture, plays accordion, and played church organ during his youth.

References

External links 
 
 Ivan Bartoš  on Czech Pirate Party website

1980 births
21st-century Czech politicians
Czech Pirate Party MPs
Living people
Hussite people
People from Jablonec nad Nisou
Charles University alumni
Leaders of the Czech Pirate Party
Members of the Chamber of Deputies of the Czech Republic (2017–2021)
Members of the Chamber of Deputies of the Czech Republic (2021–2025)
Regional Development ministers of the Czech Republic
Czech Pirate Party Government Ministers